Todd Island is a small island in Beaverlodge Lake, Northern Saskatchewan, Canada. The island is located around 5 km south of the former site of Eldorado, Saskatchewan.

References

Uninhabited islands of Saskatchewan
Lake islands of Saskatchewan